Kodekal  (Kodigal) is a panchayat village in the southern state of Karnataka, India. It is located in the Shorapur Taluka of Yadgir district in Karnataka. Kodekal is 8.5 km by road north-northeast of Jogandabhavi, and 4 km by road northwest of Bardevanhal, across the Dhon River.

Demographics
Population (2001). • Total, 6,056. Languages. • Official, Kannada · Time zone · IST (UTC+5:30). Kodekal (Kodigal) is a panchayat village in the southern state of Karnataka, India. It is located. Demographics[edit].  India census, Kodekal had a population of 6,056 with 3,063 males and 2,993 females.

See also
 Yadgir

References

External links
 

Villages in Yadgir district